Handmade is the second album by the British EDM band Gravity Noir, released in 2016 by Gravity Productions, CD Baby, and Indieplant. The album was originally released in the Netherlands but almost simultaneously worldwide.

Overview
Handmade was Gravity Noir's second studio album after years of silence and subsequent reformation in 2016. Distancing from creating cover versions and completely dedicated to produce new songs. Patrick J. A. Knight, singer and founder of Gravity Noir, has revived his life's work with this production. With the collaboration of both old and new group members, they have managed to release their first real studio album.   The album had provided 4 new singles. It struggled to find its way commercially, but one single, 'Another Dimension (Dementia)' managed to get the attention of the press. Other singles released from this album are, 'Mystery Knight', 'Mind The Gap' and 'Giving Up On Music (Summer Dance Remix)'.

Track listing

Personnel 
 Patrick J. A. Knight – vocals, programming all instruments and arrangements
 Ambrosia Dash – vocals, vocal arrangements
 Andrew Williams – vocals, vocal arrangements, brass arrangements

Production personnel
 Patrick J. A. Knight – producer, engineer, mixing engineer, executive producer, music direction, remixing, mastering, 
 Andrew Williams - design, photography

Release details

References

External links 
 Handmade by Gravity Noir at Musicbrainz
 Gravity Noir - Handmade at Discogs
 

2016 albums
Gravity Noir albums